Herman is a comic strip written and drawn by Jim Unger. While the daily ran as a single panel with a typeset caption, it expanded every Sunday as a full multi-panel strip with balloons.

Publication history 
Unger's brother Bob was a major influence for the Herman comic. Herman was syndicated from 1975 to 1992, when Unger retired, running for 18 years in 600 newspapers in 25 countries.

In 1990, Herman became the first newspaper cartoon syndicated in East Germany. Shortly afterward, Unger produced a new book, Herman: Over the Wall. He joked, "Six months later the (Berlin) Wall came down; I think that's what did it."

On 2 June 1997, Herman returned to syndication with a mix of classic strip reprints and occasional new material under the United Media umbrella. "It gives me the opportunity to bring them up to date and to introduce Herman to a new generation," Unger said in the 31 May 1997, edition of the Detroit News. He did not expect to return to full-time cartooning but planned to add new material.

Unger died in 2012; reruns of Herman continue to run on Andrews McMeel Syndication's GoComics website, via the Newspaper Enterprise Association.

Characters and story
The eponymous Herman is actually anybody within the confines of the strip—a man, a woman, a child, any animal or even an extraterrestrial. All characters are rendered in Unger's unique style as hulking, beetle-browed figures with pronounced noses and jaws, and often sport comically understated facial expressions.

An earlier strip, Herman, created by Clyde Lamb, published from 1949 through 1966, had no relation to Unger's strip.

Themes
While there is no apparent continuity to the daily panels, there are several recurring themes:
Married life: Wife: "What would you rate me as? A 10? 9? 8? 7? 6? 5? 4, 3? (pause) Not 2!" Husband: "Keep going."
Bad cooking: A woman says to her husband, "I made you a meat pie and the dog ate it," to which the husband replies, "I'll miss the dog."
Strange neighbors: A television comes crashing through the wall. Outside, a man yells "You missed!"
The elderly: "There's an elephant on TV, and Grandma's throwing peanuts at it!"
Animals: One penguin to another. "We'd have arrived earlier, but our iceberg hit a ship."
Children in school: "Don't drag your fingernails on the chalkboard, Niles," a teacher with shattered glasses and standing-up hair says.
Intelligent babies: A man steps into the baby's room with a bottle. "It's about time! Another five minutes, and I'd have died of thirst!"
Restaurants: A waiter dumps the customer's food on the tablecloth. "Terribly sorry about this, but we're short of plates."
Life in prison: Two prisoners have been caught cutting the bars from their cell window. "We found it quite stuffy in here, warden."
Art: A painting depicts a single half-circle at the bottom of the canvas: "This one's called 'Here Comes the Sun.'"
Hunting and fishing: A hunter with the rifle realizes he has just blown the landing gear off of an airborne 747.
People with bizarre ailments or injuries: A man in the hospital has a surgical scar that covers the perimeter of his torso. "It took us a while to find your appendix," the doctor explains.
Encounters with extraterrestrial life: A UFO has been pulled over for speeding. "Ignorance of the law is no excuse, buddy!"
Ordinary people thrust into bizarre situations: A man on a modern-day park bench encounters a Viking, who asks "Is the war still on?"
Being overweight: An overweight man stands on a bathroom scale, and asks his wife, "What do you mean the needle's broken off?"
Mispronounced words: A sheriff's deputy brings the sheriff a cat. The sheriff says "I said 'Round up a POSSE!'."
Courts: A judge does not know that the defendant he is speaking to is a plywood cutout. "You have been found guilty of forgery."
Strange inventions: A man has a giant showerhead over his house. "I get a good deal on fire insurance."
Medical: Doctor tells overweight patient "Walk two miles per day, but not on Morning Glory Circle."

Several collections of the comic strip were printed.

Awards
Unger received the National Cartoonists Society's Newspaper Panel Cartoon Award for 1982 and 1987 for his work on the strip.

References

Sources
Strickler, Dave. Syndicated Comic Strips and Artists, 1924-1995: The Complete Index. Cambria, California: Comics Access, 1995. 

Gag-a-day comics
Comics characters introduced in 1975
1975 comics debuts
1992 comics endings
Canadian comic strips
Canadian comics characters